Rex Lewis-Clack (born June 24, 1995) is an American pianist, considered a prodigious musical savant.

Biography 

Rex Lewis-Clack was born in Southern California, the son of Cathleen Lewis and Wasaga Clack. He was born with a cerebral Arachnoid cyst and with a form of blindness called Septo-optic dysplasia. Lewis-Clack began his life education at 6 months of age at The Blind Children's Center in Los Angeles.

Given a piano keyboard at the age of two, Lewis-Clack became fascinated, and as he developed musical skills, he also learned to talk and walk.
He was completely self-taught at the piano until the age of 5, when he began taking lessons. During one of his first lessons, one of two piano teachers showed him one scale, one time, and he played the other 11 scales back that same day. By the age of 7, Lewis-Clack's piano abilities coupled with both blindness and manifestation of autistic symptoms led to the label “prodigious musical savant.” 
“Savant Syndrome is a rare but remarkable condition in which persons with developmental disabilities, including but not limited to autistic disorder, have some spectacular 'islands of genius' that stand in marked, jarring contrast to overall limitations.”. A prodigious savant has skills that are so remarkable that they would be termed at a ‘prodigy’ or ‘genius’ level if present in a non-disabled person). The prodigious savant represents a very high threshold group and there are probably fewer than 100 such known persons living worldwide at the present time. Lewis-Clack has been educated in the public school system, since age 5.

Media and Performance 

Lewis-Clack came to the attention of CBS’s 60 Minutes when he was 7-years old, and filmed for his first profile, called “Musically Speaking,” with correspondent Lesley Stahl and Producer Shari Finkelstein, which aired September 28, 2003, when he was 8-years old. 60 Minutes has subsequently aired two other profiles, both named “Rex,” the first of which aired in 2005 (“Meet Rex”)  and the second which aired in 2008 (Rex—A Musical Savant's Remarkable Strides). The 2008 profile “Rex,” was the winner of the 2009 Edward R. Murrow award for excellence in news coverage in the category “Best Feature in a Newsmagazine.”

Lewis-Clack was also featured alongside British musical savant Derek Paravicini (16 years Rex's senior) in the Focus Productions’ 2006 documentary “The Musical Genius,” which aired on Britain's television series Extraordinary People and aired in the United States under the title “Musical Savants” on The Discovery Health Channel.
In 2011 The Science Channel aired a documentary on Rex as one part of the eight-part series “Ingenious Minds,” with the subtitle “The Boy with the Musical Mind.” 
Following Lewis-Clack's 2003 “60 Minutes” profile “Musically Speaking,” he received invitations from groups around the world to play his music. Lewis-Clack travels with his mother to select engagements around the world in a motivational/ inspirational format, which allows him to perform in the context of education or fundraising for causes linked to disability. Along with classical repertoire, and vocal arrangements, Lewis-Clack plays instantaneous improvisations on given themes, or plays a selection in a variety of different styles.

Awards 

Lewis-Clack was the recipient of the 2006 “Winspiration Award” in Baden-Baden, Germany, which awards individuals who “inspire” others to “win.” 

Lewis-Clack's 2008 60 Minutes profile “Rex” was the recipient of the 2009 Edward R. Murrow Award for excellence in tele-journalism in the category “Best Feature in a Newsmagazine.”

Television Documentary Coverage 

 2003—CBS 60 Minutes profile “Musically Speaking”
 2005—CBS 60 Minutes profile “Rex.”
 2006—Discovery Health profile in the United States--“Musical Savants.” The documentary airs on Channel 5 on Britain's "Extraordinary People" under the title “The Musical Genius.”
 2008—CBS 60 Minutes profile “Rex.”—winner of The Edward R. Murrow Award . . . “Best Feature in a Newsmagazine.”
 2011-2012—The Science Channel—“Ingenious Minds” (first aired in December 2010 under title “Tormented by Genius,” but was subsequently revised and first aired under the new title “Ingenious Minds” in March 2011.)

Official Biography 

“Rex—A Mother, Her Autistic Child, and the Music that Transformed their Lives,” by Cathleen Lewis was published in 2008 by Thomas Nelson Publishers. In addition to English, the biography has been translated into 8 foreign languages (Italian, German, Polish, Japanese, Korean, Simplified Chinese and Traditional Chinese, and Indonesian)

References 

 Ockelford, Adam. In the Key of Genius. Random House UK (April 22, 2008) 

1995 births
Autistic savants
Blind musicians
Living people
People on the autism spectrum